Michael Antonio Ansley (born February 8, 1967) is an American former professional basketball player. He played three seasons in the National Basketball Association (NBA) and last played with Sportino Inowrocław of the Polish Dominet Bank Ekstraliga.

College career
A 6'7" (201 cm) 225 lb. (102 kg) forward, Ansley played college basketball at the University of Alabama.

Professional career
Ansley was selected by the Orlando Magic in the second round (37th overall) of the 1989 NBA draft. He played three years in the NBA for the Magic, Philadelphia 76ers and Charlotte Hornets. His best year in the NBA came during his rookie season as a member of the Magic, appearing in 72 games, and averaging 8.7 points and 5.0 rebounds per game.

After leaving the NBA, he played in various clubs in Israel, Spain, Turkey, and Poland.

During his career in Poland, Ansley took part in Ratusz Basket 2009 in Białystok. Apart from performing in a dunk contest and showing his freestyle skills, he also played a 1-vs-1 game against Horry Paz - an infamous Polish journalist. To everybody's surprise, not only was he utterly defeated, but also he was crossed over by this amateur player. Nonetheless, the event was successful and is still well remembered is the basketball society in Białystok.

References

External links

I fell in love with Europe – the curious case of Mike Ansley

1967 births
Living people
Alabama Crimson Tide men's basketball players
American expatriate basketball people in Israel
American expatriate basketball people in Poland
American expatriate basketball people in Spain
American expatriate basketball people in Turkey
American men's basketball players
Asseco Gdynia players
Basketball players from Birmingham, Alabama
Baloncesto Málaga players
Birmingham Bandits players
Charlotte Hornets players
Club Ourense Baloncesto players
Darüşşafaka Basketbol players
Hapoel Galil Elyon players
Liga ACB players
Orlando Magic draft picks
Orlando Magic players
Philadelphia 76ers players
Power forwards (basketball)
Stal Ostrów Wielkopolski players
Trefl Sopot players
Turów Zgorzelec players